The 1929–30 season was the 32nd in the history of the Southern League. The league consisted of Eastern and Western Divisions. Aldershot Town won the Eastern Division and Bath City won the Western Division. Aldershot were declared Southern League champions after winning a championship play-off 4–2.

Three clubs from the Southern League applied to join the Football League, with Thames Association being successful. They replaced Merthyr Town, who rejoined the Southern League the following season. In addition to Thames, a total of 12 clubs left the Southern League at the end of this season.

Eastern Division

A total of 19 teams contest the division, including 18 sides from previous season and one new team.

Newly elected team:
 Northampton Town II  - returned to the league after the resignation in 1925

Western Division

A total of 15 teams contest the division, including 14 sides from previous season and one new team.

Newly elected team:
 Llanelly - returned to the league after the resignation in 1925

Football League election
Three Southern League clubs, Aldershot Town, Thames Association and Llanelly, applied to join the Football League. Thames were successful, finishing second in the ballot. Aldershot also finished above Third Division South club Merthyr Town, who replaced their reserves in the Western Division the following season.

References

1929-30
4
1929–30 in Welsh football